Avery County Schools is a PK–12 graded school district serving Avery County, North Carolina, USA. Its eight schools served 2,239 students in the 2010–2011 school year.

History
Before the creation of Avery County in 1911, education was handled by Caldwell, Mitchell, and Watauga counties, from which Avery was formed.

The school district has grown to become the second largest employer in Avery County.

Student demographics
For the 2010–2011 school year, Avery County Schools had a total population of 2,239 students and 165.50 teachers on a FTE basis. This produced a student-teacher ratio of 13.53:1. Of the student total, the sex ratio was 50% male to 50% female. The demographic group make-up was: White, 91%; Hispanic, 8%; Black, 0%; American Indian, 0%; and Asian/Pacific Islander, 0% (two or more races: 1%). For the same school year, 62.08% of the students received free and reduced-cost lunches.

Governance
The primary governing body of Avery County Schools follows a council–manager government format with a five-member Board of Education appointing a Superintendent to run the day-to-day operations of the system. The school system is currently located in the North Carolina State Board of Education's Seventh District.

Board of Education
The five members of the Board of Education meet on the first Tuesday of each month. The current members of the board are John Greene (Chair), Kathey Aldridge (Vice-Chair), Steve Smith, Bob Clark and Keith Tutterow.

Superintendent
The position of superintendent is currently vacant. The previous superintendent, Bryan Taylor, resigned the position in June 2019.

Member schools
Avery County Schools has eight schools ranging from pre-kindergarten to twelfth grade. They are one high school, two middle schools and five elementary schools.

High schools
 Avery County High School (Newland)

Middle schools
 Avery Middle School (Newland)
 Cranberry Middle School (Cranberry)

Elementary schools
 Banner Elk Elementary School (Banner Elk)
 Crossnore Elementary School (Crossnore)
 Freedom Trail Elementary School (Elk Park)
 Newland Elementary School (Newland)
 Riverside Elementary School (Newland)

See also
List of school districts in North Carolina

References

External links
 

Education in Avery County, North Carolina
School districts in North Carolina